Cryptophthalmos is a rare congenital anomaly in which the skin is continuous over the eyeball with absence of palpebral fissures and presence of eyelashes. It is classified into three types: complete, incomplete and abortive. Failure of eyelid separation can be associated with maldevelopment of the underlying cornea and microphthalmia. Cryptophthalmos usually occurs on both sides and occurs in association with multiple other malformations collectively referred to as Fraser syndrome. Along with microphthalmia (small or underdeveloped globe), it may be associated with a tuft of hair.

References

External links

Congenital disorders of eyes